Education Policy Analysis Archives is a peer-reviewed open access academic journal established in 1993 by Gene V. Glass (Arizona State University). Articles are published in English, Spanish, or Portuguese. The journal covers education policy at all levels of the education system in all nations. The editor-in-chief is Audrey Amrein-Beardsley (Arizona State University) and the Consulting Editor is Gustavo Enrique Fischman (Arizona State University). The journal is abstracted and indexed in Education Research Complete and Scopus.

External links

Publications established in 1993
Education journals
Multilingual journals
Creative Commons Attribution-licensed journals
Arizona State University